Local elections were held in the United Kingdom in 1984. There was a slight reversal in the Conservative government's fortunes, but the party remained ahead.  The projected share of the vote was Conservatives 38%, Labour 37%, Liberal-SDP Alliance 21%.

Labour gained 88 seats, bringing their number of councillors to 8,870 in the first elections under the leadership of Neil Kinnock who had succeeded Michael Foot the previous autumn.

The Conservatives lost 164 seats, leaving them with 10,393 councillors.

The SDP-Liberal Alliance, now led by David Owen, gained 160 seats and finished with 2,331 councillors.

Summary of results

England

Metropolitan boroughs
All 36 metropolitan borough councils had one third of their seats up for election.

District councils
In 123 districts one third of the council was up for election.

A further 20 councils had passed a resolution under section 7 (4) (b) of the Local Government Act 1972, requesting a system of elections by thirds. They could do so because they had had their new ward boundaries introduced at the 1983 elections.

Scotland

District councils

References

Local elections 2006. House of Commons Library Research Paper 06/26.
Vote 1999 BBC News
Vote 2000 BBC News

 
May 1984 events in the United Kingdom